Raul Santos (born 1 June 1992) is an Austrian handball player for SC DHfK Leipzig and the Austrian national team.

References

External links

1992 births
Living people
Austrian male handball players
Austrian people of Dominican Republic descent
Sportspeople of Dominican Republic descent
Expatriate handball players
Handball-Bundesliga players
VfL Gummersbach players
THW Kiel players
Sportspeople from Santo Domingo